For the Soul of Rafael is a 1920 American silent drama film directed by Harry Garson and starring Clara Kimball Young, Bertram Grassby and Eugenie Besserer.

Cast
 Clara Kimball Young as Marta Raquel Estevan
 Bertram Grassby as Rafael Artega
 Eugenie Besserer as Dona Luisa
 Juan de la Cruz as El Capitan
 J. Frank Glendon as Keith Bryton
 Ruth King as 	Ana Mendez
 Helene Sullivan as 	Angela Bryton
 Paula Merritt as 	Polonia
 Maude Emory as 	Teresa
 Edward Kimball as 	Ricardo

References

Bibliography
 Connelly, Robert B. The Silents: Silent Feature Films, 1910-36, Volume 40, Issue 2. December Press, 1998.
 Munden, Kenneth White. The American Film Institute Catalog of Motion Pictures Produced in the United States, Part 1. University of California Press, 1997.

External links
 

1920 films
1920 drama films
1920s English-language films
American silent feature films
Silent American drama films
American black-and-white films
Films directed by Harry Garson
1920s American films